Karol Wojtyła (18 July 1879 – 18 February 1941) was a soldier, a non-commissioned officer of the Austro-Hungarian Army and a Captain of the Polish Armed Forces' administration and the father and namesake of Karol Józef Wojtyła, who later became Pope John Paul II in 1978. He died from what is believed to be a heart attack in 1941 while his son was away, and this event is considered to have influenced his son's decision to join the seminary.

Life 

Karol Wojtyła was born on 18 July 1879 in Lipnik. He was a son of Maciej Wojtyła (born in 1852 in Czaniec, died 23 September 1923 in Wadowice) and his first wife Anna Marianna Przeczek (1853–1881, born and died in Lipnik).

He married Emilia Kaczorowska on 10 February 1906. The wedding took place in Kraków, in Saints Peter and Paul Church, Kraków. They had three children: Edmund (1906–1932), Olga Maria (died soon after birth on 7 July 1916), Karol Józef (1920–2005).

He was a tailor by trade. In 1900 he was called up for the  Austro-Hungarian Army. He spent a total of 27 years in the army. He was a non-commissioned officer. During World War I he was transferred to Hranice in Moravia, and he fought in the Gorlice–Tarnów Offensive in May 1915. In August 1915, he was appointed as an officer of the military registrar. On 1 September 1915 he was a noncommissioned officer of the 56th Infantry Regiment. He worked in the Wadowice County Supplementary Command until 1918. Before 1917 he was awarded the Military Cross of Merit with a crown.

After Poland regained its independence, he was admitted to the Polish Army and was an officer of the 12th Infantry Regiment from Wadowice. He was promoted to the rank of Poruchik in the corps of professional administrative officers of the office department. In 1924, he served in the Wadowice County Supplementary Command. Before 1928 he was retired. In 1934, as a retired lieutenant, he remained in the records of the Poviat Supplementary Command Wadowice.

In 1929, as a result of myocarditis and kidney failure, his wife died, and three years later, his son, Edmund Wojtyla, died of scarlet fever. In 1938 he moved from Wadowice, together with his adolescent son Karol, to Kraków. He died there on 18 February 1941. He was buried in the military cemetery on Prandoty Street in Kraków.

Commemoration/beatification process 
The role of Karol Wojtyła Senior was played by Olgierd Łukaszewicz in the film Karol: A Man Who Became Pope and Robert Mazurkiewicz in the Pope John Paul II (miniseries).  Alfred Burke played him in the film Pope John Paul II .

In 2018, one of the streets in Lublin was named for him and for his wife. The Wojtyls are also patrons of a street in Wadowice.

On 11 March 2020 Marek Jędraszewski, Archbishop of Kraków, announced the beginning of the process of beatification of Karol and Emilia Wojtyła; The process of beatification of John Paul II's parents began officially on 7 May 2020 in Wadowice.

References

Bibliografia 

 
 
 
 Genealogia Polska – przodkowie Karola Wojtyły
 "Dokumenty wojskowe Karola Wojtyły"
 "Dane metrykalne Karola Wojtyły"
 "Dane metrykalne Emilia Kaczorowska"
 "Dane metrykalne Olga Wojtyła"
 "Dane metrykalne Edmund Wojtyła"

External links 

 

1941 deaths
1879 births
Polish people of the Polish–Soviet War
Polish people of World War I
Polish Servants of God
People from Wadowice
Papal family members
Pope John Paul II
Burials at Rakowicki Cemetery